Radio Thailand is the public broadcasting radio station in Thailand owned by the National Broadcasting Services of Thailand based in Bangkok. The station has six FM national radio, 65 FM provincial radio, three AM national radio, 46 AM provincial radio and World Service. Some Radio Thailand provincial radio stations can be received in neighbor countries of Thailand like Malaysia, Laos, Cambodia and Myanmar.

FM stations
 FM 88.0 MHz – English language services
 FM 92.5 MHz – Radio Thailand National Radio Network Bangkok
 FM 105.0 MHz – Happy Family Radio (for children, youth and families)
and 65 FM provincial radio stations

AM stations
 AM 819 kHz – For live broadcast
 AM 891 kHz – Radio Thailand National Radio Network Bangkok
 AM 1467 kHz – National Education
and 46 AM provincial radio stations

Shortwave radio
 Radio Thailand World Service – Broadcasts in Thai, Khmer, Malay, English, Burmese, German, Laotian, Japanese, Vietnamese and Chinese languages for International

References

External links

Radio in Thailand
Radio stations established in 1930
1930 establishments in Siam
Radio stations in Thailand